The  is a Japanese railway line connecting Toyohashi Station in Toyohashi, Aichi with Tatsuno Station in Tatsuno, Nagano, operated by Central Japan Railway Company (JR Central). The line links eastern Aichi Prefecture and southern Nagano Prefecture through northwestern Shizuoka Prefecture. It goes through steep mountains as well as cities such as Iida and Ina. The line was originally four different private railway lines, the first of which opened in 1897.

The line has an unusually high number of so-called Hikyō stations, or hikyo-eki, which have since lost their nearby communities due to depopulation. There are 94 such stations along the route. The line has been described as the "holy land for those who love touring hikyo-eki". The phrase was coined in 1999 by Takanobu Ushiyama and friends, for railroad stations that are isolated and little used.

Traveling the entire length of the 195.7 km (121.6 mi) line by local trains takes six hours.

Basic data
Operators, distances:
Central Japan Railway Company (Services and tracks)
Toyohashi – Tatsuno: 195.7 km (121.6 mi)
Japan Freight Railway Company (Services)
Toyohashi – Toyokawa: 8.7 km (5.4 mi)
Motozenkōji – Tatsuno: 61.9 km (38.5 mi)
Double-tracked section: Toyohashi – Toyokawa
Railway signalling:
Toyokawa – Tatsuno: Special Automatic, a simplified automatic system.
CTC center: Iida Operation Control Center

Services

The limited express  runs between Toyohashi and Iida twice a day. The rapid  runs between Iida and Okaya. Local service is generally divided into three parts by Hon-Nagashino and Tenryūkyō stations. The section near Toyohashi functions as commuter rail for the city, while the section between Hon-Nagashino and Tenryūkyō is a mountain railway with fewer passengers.

Stations

From Toyohashi to Iida
L: 
R: 
I: 

All trains stop at stations marked "●" and pass stations marked "-", "↓", or "↑". Arrows indicate the direction of rapid trains. Some trains stop at stops marked "▲".

From Iida to Okaya
L: 
R: 
M: 

All trains stop at stations marked "●" and pass stations marked "-", "↓", or "↑". Arrows also indicate the directions the rapid trains run.

Rolling stock
 211 series 3-car EMUs (from 15 March 2015, on JR East inter-running services)
 213-5000 series 2-car EMUs
 313-3000 series EMUs
 373 series 3-car EMUs (on Inaji limited express and some all-stations "Local" services)

Past rolling stock
 115 series EMUs (until 14 March 2014, on JR East inter-running services)
 119 series EMUs (1983 – 31 March 2012)

History

The Toyokawa Railway opened the section from Toyohashi to Toyokawa in 1897, extending the line to Omi in 1900. At the northern end, the Ina Electric Railway opened the Tatsuno to Ina-Matsushima section (electrified at 1,200 V DC) in 1909, extending the line to Tenryukyo in sections between 1911 and 1927. The Horaitera Railway opened the Omi to Mikawa-Kawai section in 1923, and electrified it at 1,500 V DC in 1925 in conjunction with the electrification of the Toyohashi to Omi section the same year. The Toyohashi to Toyokawa section was double-tracked the following year. The Sanshin Railway opened the Tenryukyo to Kadoshima section as an electrified (1,500 V DC) line in 1932, the Mikawa-Kawai to Toei section (and all subsequent stages) as an electrified line in 1933, and connected the two sections (completing the line) in 1936. All four companies were nationalised in 1943.

In 1955, the overhead line voltage of the Tatsuno to Tenryukyo section was increased to 1,500 V DC.

CTC signalling was commissioned on the line between 1983 and 1984, and freight services ceased in 1996.

Former connecting lines
 Hon-Nagashino Station: A 23 km line to Mikawa-Taguchi, electrified at 1,500 V DC, opened between 1930 and 1932. Two 762mm gauge forest railways connected to this line: the Damine forest railway, which connected at the station of the same name, consisted of a 19 km 'main line' (including a tunnel) and a 7 km branch, operated between 1932 and 1960; the Taguchi forest railway connected at the terminus station, consisted of a 10 km 'main line' and a 6 km branch, operated between 1934 and 1963. Both forest railways were notable for initially employing people and "large dogs" to haul the empty wagons upgrade, which then rolled downhill when loaded. The Mikawa-Taguchi line closed following flood damage in 1968.

Proposed connecting line
 Chubu-Tenryu Station: Construction started on a 35 km line to Tenryu-Futamata on the Hamanako Line in 1967. Proposed to involve 20 bridges and 14 tunnels, about 13 km of roadbed, and about 50% of the overall work had been completed when construction was abandoned in 1980.

See also
List of railway lines in Japan

References

External links

 JR Central official website 
 JR Central official website

 
1067 mm gauge railways in Japan
Railway lines opened in 1897